This is a list of memorials to Martin Luther King Jr.

United States 
There are numerous memorials to King in the United States, including:

Memorial sites 

 In 1980, the U.S. Department of the Interior designated King's boyhood home in Atlanta and several nearby buildings the Martin Luther King Jr. National Historic Site.

 Dr. Martin Luther King Jr. Memorial Gardens in Raleigh, NC is the first public park in the U.S. devoted to Dr. King and the Civil Rights Movement. The gardens feature a life-size sculpture of Dr. King and a 12-ton granite water monument honoring the area’s civil rights leaders.

 Brown Chapel A.M.E. Church in Selma, Alabama

 King County, Washington, rededicated its name in his honor in 1986 and changed its logo to an image of his face in 2007.

 The city government center in Harrisburg, Pennsylvania, is named in honor of King.

 The Martin Luther King Jr. Memorial Bridge in Fort Wayne, Indiana

Buildings 

 Martin Luther King Jr. Memorial Library

 Dr. Martin Luther King Jr. Library

 The National Civil Rights Museum, at the Lorraine Motel in Memphis, Tennessee, where King died

 Brown Chapel A.M.E. Church in Selma, Alabama

Sculptures 

 Martin Luther King Jr. Memorial on the National Mall in Washington, D.C. King was the first African American and the fourth non-president honored with his own memorial in the National Mall area. In 1996, Congress authorized the Alpha Phi Alpha fraternity, of which King is still a member, to establish a foundation to manage fundraising and design of a national memorial to King. The memorial opened in 2011 and is administered by the National Park Service. The address of the monument, 1964 Independence Avenue, SW, commemorates the year that the Civil Rights Act of 1964 became law.
 The Landmark for Peace Memorial in Indianapolis, Indiana
 A bust of Dr. King was added to the "gallery of notables" in the United States Capitol in 1986, portraying him in a "restful, nonspeaking pose."
 The beginning words of King's "I Have a Dream" speech are etched on the steps of the Lincoln Memorial, at the place where King stood during that speech. These words from the speech—"five short lines of text carved into the granite on the steps of the Lincoln Memorial"—were etched in 2003, on the 40th anniversary of the march to Washington, by stone carver Andy Del Gallo, after a law was passed by Congress providing authorization for the inscription.
 The Embrace, unveiled in January 2023 in Boston
 The Homage to King sculpture in Atlanta, Georgia
 Hope Moving Forward statue in Atlanta
The Statue of Martin Luther King Jr. in Atlanta
 The Dream sculpture in Portland, Oregon
 On October 11, 2015, the Atlanta Journal-Constitution reported a proposed "Freedom Bell" may be installed atop Stone Mountain honoring King and his "I Have a Dream" speech, specifically the line "Let freedom ring from Stone Mountain of Georgia."
 A bust of Martin Luther King Jr. has been in the collection of the collection of the Smithsonian Institution's National Portrait Gallery since 1974, and displayed in the White House since 2000; a second cast is in the collection of the National Museum of African American History and Culture.
 In Norfolk, Virginia stands a memorial in honor of King. The 83-foot-high granite obelisk was conceived by former Norfolk Councilman and General District Court Judge Joseph A. Jordan Jr.

 The Martin Luther King, Jr. Memorial at Yerba Buena Gardens in San Francisco is located behind a waterfall,  The King memorial consists of large, etched glass excerpts of King's speeches in the languages of San Francisco's sister cities, and also includes a large green space where performance arts events are held throughout the year. The entire memorial was a collaborative project between Sculptor Houston Conwill, Poet Estella Majoza and Architect Joseph De Pace. The memorial is located on the gardens' second block, between Howard and Folsom Streets, which was opened in 1998, with a dedication to Martin Luther King, Jr. by Mayor Willie Brown.

 The Martin Luther King, Jr Memorial at the Martin Luther King Drive station of the Hudson Bergen Light Rail in the Jackson Hill section of Jersey City, New Jersey includes a bust of King and accompanying bas reliefs.

A memorial bust of Martin Luther King, Jr., which was approved by the King family, was officially unveiled at Martin Luther King, Jr. Park at Plant Riverside District in Savannah, Georgia on January 15, 2022. The bronze bust on a granite base is the first memorial to Martin Luther King, Jr. in Savannah.

Internationally 

Numerous other memorials honor him around the world, including:
 Dr Martin Luther King Jr. Statue at King's Quad courtyard next to the King’s Hall of Newcastle University in North East England: A bronze statue was unveiled in November 2017 to mark the 50th anniversary of Dr Martin Luther King Jr.'s visit to the university to accept an honorary degree. 
 "Martin Luther Kings plan" (park), with art installation Befrielsen (English: Liberation), in Uppsala, Sweden
 The Reverend Martin Luther King Jr. Church in Debrecen, Hungary
 The King-Luthuli Transformation Center in Johannesburg, South Africa
 The Rev. Martin Luther King Jr. Forest in Israel's Southern Galilee region (along with the Coretta Scott King Forest in Biriya Forest, Israel)
 The Martin Luther King Jr. School in Accra, Ghana
 The Gandhi-King Plaza (garden), at the India International Center in New Delhi, India
 One of the 10 statues of 20th-century martyrs on the façade of Westminster Abbey, London, UK
 Statue of Martin Luther King Jr. (Mexico City)

See also
 Civil rights movement in popular culture
 List of streets named after Martin Luther King Jr.

References

 
King, Martin Luther Jr
Monuments and memorials of the civil rights movement